Percy Heath was a  musician.

Percy Heath may also refer to:

Percy Heath (cricketer) in Hong Kong national cricket team
Percy Heath (screenwriter) (1884-1933), American screenwriter